Feia is a genus of gobies native to shallow coastal waters of the Indian Ocean and the western Pacific Ocean.

Species
These are the currently recognized species in this genus:
 Feia dabra R. Winterbottom, 2005 (Dabra goby)
 Feia nota A. C. Gill & Mooi, 1999
 Feia nympha J. L. B. Smith, 1959 (Nymph goby)
 Feia ranta R. Winterbottom, 2003 (Ranta Goby)
 Feia seba G. R. Allen, Erdmann & Book, 2020

References

Gobiidae